The Treatment is the debut studio album by Dutch rapper Mr. Probz. It was released in the Netherlands on 16 September 2013, through Traumashop and Republic. The album has peaked to number 12 on the Dutch Albums Chart. The album includes the singles "I'm Right Here", "Turning Tables" and "Gold Days".

Track listing

Charts

Release history

References

2013 debut albums
Mr Probz albums